is a 1956 Japanese drama film directed by Tadashi Imai. It is based on an actual court case, described in the non-fiction book "Saibankan–Hito no inochi wa kenryoku de ubaeru mono ka" by attorney Hiroshi Masaki.

Cast
 Kōjirō Kusanagi
 Sachiko Hidari
 Taketoshi Naitō
 Chōko Iida
 Sō Yamamura

Awards
Mahiru no ankoku received the Blue Ribbon Award, the Mainichi Film Award and the Kinema Junpo Award for Best Film. It also received the Blue Ribbon Award and Mainichi Film Award for Best Director, Best Screenplay and Best Film Music.

References

1956 films
Best Film Kinema Junpo Award winners
Japanese courtroom films
Films about miscarriage of justice
Films based on non-fiction books
Japanese films based on actual events
Films directed by Imai Tadashi
Japanese crime drama films
Films with screenplays by Shinobu Hashimoto
Films scored by Akira Ifukube
1950s Japanese films
Japanese black-and-white films